Lasantha Alagiyawanna  (born 19 October 1967) is a Sri Lankan politician. He is a representative of Gampaha District for the United People's Freedom Alliance in the Parliament of Sri Lanka, and served as the Minister of Road Passenger Transport.

References
 

1967 births
Living people
Sri Lankan Buddhists
Members of the 13th Parliament of Sri Lanka
Members of the 14th Parliament of Sri Lanka
Members of the 15th Parliament of Sri Lanka
Members of the 16th Parliament of Sri Lanka
Government ministers of Sri Lanka
Sri Lanka Freedom Party politicians
United People's Freedom Alliance politicians